The Florida State Guard (FSG) is the state defense force of the U.S. state of Florida. The FSG was created in 1941 to serve as a stateside replacement for the Florida National Guard while the National Guard was deployed abroad during World War II. The FSG is available to the governor of Florida whenever needed, but unlike the National Guard, the FSG is trained and funded by the state and therefore can not be federalized. The FSG was reactivated in 2022 after the Florida legislature appropriated US$10 million in funding.

Background 
State defense forces are authorized by the federal government under Title 32, Section 109 of the United States Code. Twenty-three states, as well as the territory of Puerto Rico, actively maintain these forces. Florida law also allows the creation of a state defense force, either as a full-sized force when any part of the National Guard is federally deployed, or as a reserve cadre of officers and non-commissioned officers regardless of National Guard deployment.

Original incarnation

Creation 
Before the United States entered World War II, President Franklin D. Roosevelt instituted a peacetime draft, and federalized various National Guard units, including Florida's National Guard. As a result, states which had previously counted on their National Guard to maintain peace, quell riots, protect against sabotage, or repel a potential invasion were given the alternative of creating their own state-level military forces under the State Guard Act signed by President Franklin D. Roosevelt on October 21, 1940. In 1941, the Florida Legislature and Governor Holland created Florida Defense Force, later to be rebranded as the Florida State Guard.

The purpose of the state defense forces, including the FSG, was to fulfil the National Guard's state obligations. This included guarding infrastructure, protecting against sabotage, calming riots, or aiding law enforcement. Although the mainland United States was never invaded during World War II, state defenses would have shared responsibility with the federal military and National Guard in defending American territory had an invasion occurred.

During the war, the First Air Squadron of the FSG regularly patrolled the coast of Florida, searching for German U-boats. The squadron was also used to assist in search-and-rescue missions.

Membership 
Membership was open to all Florida men aged 18 to 60. The commitment lasted for three years, although members who were eligible could be drafted into the federal military at any time. Most of the members were veterans of World War I. Members of the Florida Defense Force's air wing, the First Air Squadron, were required to either have a private pilot's license or have served in the military at least one year. By 1943, the Florida State Guard numbered 2,100 Florida men in 36 units.

Organization 
Each county was able to organize its own unit so long as it could recruit at minimum fifty Florida men who met the qualifications required by the state. By 1943, there were 63 separate units of state guardsmen organized.
The FSG also maintained a separate air squadron, known as the First Air Squadron.

Equipment 
Uniforms, surplus weapons, and other equipment were provided by the state of Florida. Florida law also permitted the FSG to use National Guard armories and receive any surplus weapons and equipment offered by the Department of Defense.
The approximately 27 airplanes used by the First Air Squadron were privately owned by the fifteen individuals who piloted them; however, they were allowed to have "1st Air Squadron, Florida Defense Force" painted on both sides of the nose of each plane.

Disbandment 
The Florida State Guard was disbanded in 1947 after the Florida Army National Guard was released from Federal Active Duty.

Reactivation 
On December 2, 2021, Governor Ron DeSantis announced, in his $100 million budget for the Florida National Guard, that $3.5 million would be invested into reactivating the FSG. It would allow for training and equipment of up to 200 members. In March 2022, Florida lawmakers proposed a budget which included $10 million for reactivating the Florida State Guard. The funding would allow for an enlistment of 400 enlisted troops and six full-time civilian employees. The newly reactivated organization began soliciting applications from prospective employees in May 2022.

On June 14, 2022, Governor Ron DeSantis announced the reestablishment of the Florida State Guard as an emergency-focused civilian volunteer force and appointed retired Marine Corps. Lieutenant Colonel Chris Graham as director.

See also
 Florida Naval Militia
 Florida Wing Civil Air Patrol

References

External links 
 Florida State Guard website

Military in Florida
State defense forces of the United States
1941 establishments in Florida